Muraenichthys elerae is an eel in the family Ophichthidae (worm/snake eels). It was described by Henry Weed Fowler in 1934. It is a marine, tropical eel which is known from the Philippines, in the western central Pacific Ocean.

References

Fish described in 1934
elerae